Čatrnja may refer to:

 Čatrnja, Bosnia and Herzegovina, a village near Gradiška
 Čatrnja, Croatia, a village near Rakovica